John Grimes Walker (March 20, 1835 – September 16, 1907) was an admiral in the United States Navy who served during the Civil War.  After the war, he served as Chief of the Bureau of Navigation,  head of the Lighthouse Board, and commander-in-chief of the Squadron of Evolution and of the North Atlantic Squadron. In retirement, he led commissions to investigate the construction of a Central American canal connecting the Atlantic and Pacific Oceans.

Early life and career
Walker was born in Hillsborough, New Hampshire to Alden and Susan (Grimes) Walker. His parents moved to Iowa and Walker spent much of his youth there.  His uncle, James W. Grimes, served as Governor of Iowa and represented the state in the United States Senate.

Walker was appointed a midshipman on October 5, 1850, and graduated at the head of his class at the Naval Academy in 1856.

Civil War service
He participated in the engagements with Forts Jackson and St. Philip, as well as the Chalmette batteries during the operations which resulted in the fall of New Orleans.

He later took part in the Navy's operations against Vicksburg. During the winter of 1862 and 1863, Walker participated in the thrusts against Haines Bluff and Arkansas Post. He also took part in the Yazoo Pass Expedition, the attack on Fort Pemberton, and the capture of Yazoo City.

At the siege of Vicksburg, Walker commanded the naval gun battery attached to the 15th Army Corps. His subsequent war service included operations which resulted in the capture of Fort Fisher, and he participated in the ensuing bombardments of Forts Anderson and Caswell on the Cape Fear River and in the capture of Wilmington, North Carolina.

Post-Civil War service
Promoted to commander in 1866, Walker served as Assistant Superintendent of the Naval Academy from 1866 to 1869. After commanding  in 1869 and 1870—during which time he took the ship to Europe on a midshipman training cruise—he served as secretary to the Lighthouse Board from 1873 to 1878. 

Created in 1882, the Office of Naval Intelligence (ONI), directed its reports to the Chief of the Bureau of Navigation until 1889 when it was seconded to the assistant secretary of the navy's office.

Walker was the subject of a feature article in the September 12, 1891 edition of The New York Times.  The article detailed how, as Chief of the Bureau of Navigation, Walker gave senior officers assignments beneath their abilities in hopes that they would retire from the Navy sooner and, thereby, enable Walker to get promoted faster.

Flag assignments
Appointed rear admiral in 1894, he took the White Squadron to Hawaii in 1895 when a coup d'etat posed a threat to American interests. He received a commendation for his attitude of watchful waiting and his squadron's posture of readiness to respond to a possible emergency.

Upon his return to shore duty in 1896, he headed the Lighthouse Board and concurrently chaired the committee investigating locations for deep-water harbors in southern California.

Post-Navy activities
In 1866, Walker married Rebecca White Pickering, daughter of Henry White Pickering of Boston and Salem, Massachusetts. They had seven children.

Soon after retiring as a rear admiral in 1897, Walker was chosen to serve as President of the Nicaragua Canal Commission. Two years later, in 1899, he was appointed President of the congressional Isthmian Canal Commission to look into possible routes for a canal across the Central American isthmus.

Admiral Walker was a veteran companion of the Military Order of the Loyal Legion of the United States and the Naval Order of the United States.  He was also a hereditary companion of the Military Order of Foreign Wars.

Rear Admiral Walker died at the age of 72, at Ogunquit, Maine.

Namesakes
Two destroyers have been named  in his honor.

Dates of rank
Acting midshipman – 5 October 1850
Midshipman – 11 December 1852
Passed midshipman – 20 June 1856
Master – 22 January 1858
Lieutenant – 23 January 1858
Lieutenant commander – 16 July 1862
Commander – 25 July 1866
Captain – 25 June 1877
Commodore – 12 February 1889
Rear admiral – 23 January 1894
Retired list – 20 March 1897

Gallery

References
 

1835 births
1907 deaths
United States Navy rear admirals (upper half)
United States Naval Academy alumni
Union Navy officers
People of New Hampshire in the American Civil War
People from Hillsborough, New Hampshire
People from Ogunquit, Maine